Stagshaw Garden is a woodland garden situated south of Ambleside, in Cumbria, England, and in the ownership of the National Trust.

The garden is noted for its shrubs, including rhododendrons, azaleas and camellias.

References

External links
Stagshaw Garden information at the National Trust

National Trust properties in the Lake District
Gardens in Cumbria
South Lakeland District
Woodland gardens